Epirochroa griseovaria is a species of beetle in the family Cerambycidae. It was described by Fairmaire in 1896.

Subspecies
 Epirochroa griseovaria griseovaria Fairmaire, 1896
 Epirochroa griseovaria occidentalis Breuning, 1980

References

Crossotini
Beetles described in 1896